Jehu Glancy Jones (October 7, 1811 – March 24, 1878) was a Democratic member of the U.S. House of Representatives from Pennsylvania. Often called "Glancy", he was a top adviser on Democratic Party affairs to his close friend James Buchanan, especially when President-elect Buchanan was picking his cabinet in 1856-1857. After he was defeated for reelection, Buchanan appointed him Ambassador to the Austrian Empire.

Biography
J. Glancy Jones was born in Caernarvon Township, Pennsylvania.  He attended Kenyon College, studied theology and was ordained to the ministry of the Episcopal Church in 1835 and withdrew in 1841.  He later studied law, was admitted to the bar in Georgia in 1841 and commenced practice at Easton, Pennsylvania.  He was district attorney for Berks County, Pennsylvania, from 1847 to 1849.  He was a delegate to the Democratic State conventions in 1848, 1849, and 1855, and served as president in 1855.  He was a delegate to the Democratic National Convention in 1848 and 1856 and served as vice president in 1848.

Jones was elected as a Democrat to the Thirty-second Congress.  He declined to be a candidate for renomination in 1852.  He was elected to the Thirty-third Congress to fill the vacancy caused by the death of Henry A. Muhlenberg.  He was reelected to the Thirty-fourth and Thirty-fifth Congresses.  He served as chairman of the United States House Committee on Ways and Means during the Thirty-fifth Congress.  He was an unsuccessful candidate for election in 1858, and resigned October 30, 1858.  On November 1, 1858 he was appointed Minister Resident to the Austrian Empire by President James Buchanan, and served from December 15, 1858 to November 14, 1861.  After his service he resumed the practice of law, and died in Reading, Pennsylvania, in 1878.  Interment in Reading's Charles Evans Cemetery.

In terms of his legacy to American history, biographer Michael Todd Landis  states:
Leading Northern Democrats such as Jones and Buchanan were not romantic defenders of working men, as some scholars have claimed; nor were they moderates striving to save the Union from extreme sectionalism. Rather, they were proslavery activists whose willful actions had direct and disastrous effects on the nation. Their policies enraged free-state voters and caused the fatal split in the Democratic Party that resulted in Lincoln’s election, which, in turn, triggered disunion. They were culpable and responsible—a fact that should not be forgotten or overlooked.

Notes and references

Sources

The Political Graveyard

1811 births
1878 deaths
Burials at Charles Evans Cemetery
Pennsylvania lawyers
Ambassadors of the United States to Austria
19th-century American Episcopalians
Kenyon College alumni
Democratic Party members of the United States House of Representatives from Pennsylvania
19th-century American diplomats
19th-century American politicians
19th-century American lawyers